Dick Scott may refer to:
Dick Scott (American football) (1924–2012), American college football player
Dick Scott (right-handed pitcher) (1883–1911), American Major League Baseball pitcher
Dick Scott (left-handed pitcher) (1933–2020), American Major League Baseball pitcher
Dick Scott (shortstop) (born 1962), American former Major League Baseball shortstop
Dick Scott (footballer) (1941–2018), English footballer
Richard Scott (doctor) (1914–1983), Scottish professor of general practice
Richard M. Scott (1918–2005), mayor of Lancaster, Pennsylvania
Dick Scott (historian) (1923–2020), New Zealand writer
William Richard Scott ((born 1932), American sociologist

See also
Richard Scott (disambiguation)